The 50th Space Communications Squadron (50 SCS) is a squadron of the United States Space Force located at Schriever Air Force Base, Colorado.  The squadron provides command and control systems, configuration control, and systems integrations for seven Department of Defense space programs including $8.2 billion Satellite Control Network supporting $50 billion in national satellite and terrestrial systems for United States, allied, and coalition forces.

The squadron operates and maintains 22 Defense Information Systems Agency nodes providing secure and unsecure voice and data communications for over 485 worldwide sites as well as over $100 million in base infrastructure supporting over 8,900 personnel.

The 50 SCS has been operating and maintaining Global Broadcast Service (GBS) since February 2009 and is working on transitioning it to a new Defense Enterprise Computing Center architecture.

50 SCS manages U.S. Space Force's Global Command and Control System.

The squadron administers the MAJCOM Communications Coordination Center overseeing command and control of AFSPC-wide mission-unique communications as well as operating and maintaining the command's Global Command and Control System and Space Digital Information Network.

When the 850th Space Communications Squadron was inactivated on January 31, 2006, most of its functions and personnel were incorporated into 50 SCS.

Chain of command
 United States Department of Defense
 United States Space Force
 Space Operations Command
 Space Base Delta 1
 50th Mission Support Group

Lineage

 Constituted 50th Communications Squadron, November 15, 1952
 Activated, January 1, 1953
 Discontinued and inactivated, July 1, 1962
 Activated, March 1, 1991
 Inactivated, September 30, 1991
 Redesignated 50th Satellite Communications Squadron, January 1, 1992
 Activated, January 30, 1992
 Redesignated 50th Space Communications Squadron, July 1, 1992
 Redesignated 50th Communications Squadron, December 1, 1997
 Redesignated 50th Space Communications Squadron, October 1, 2002

Assignments
 50th Air Base (later 50th Combat Support) Group, January 1, 1953 – July 1, 1962
 50th Tactical Fighter Wing, 1 May –  September 30, 1991
 50th Operations Group, January 30, 1992
 50th Communications Group, December 1, 1997
 50th Maintenance Group, October 1, 2002
 50th Communications Group, June 1, 2003 – March 9, 2004
 50th Network Operations Group, March 10, 2004 – 2020
 50th Mission Support Group, July 24, 2020 - present (due to reorganizations that happened due to the standup of the United States Space Force)

Stations
 Clovis AFB, NM, January 1 –  July 23, 1953
 Hahn AB, Germany, August 10, 1953
 Toul-Rosieres AB, France, July 10, 1956
 Hahn AB, Germany, September 1, 1959 – July 1, 1962
 Hahn AB, Germany, 1 May –  September 30, 1991
 Falcon Air Force Station (later Base, later Schriever AFB), CO, January 30, 1992

Commanders
 Lt Col Jody D. Acres, January 30, 1992? – July 12, 1994
 Maj Robert M. Flowers, July 13, 1994 – August 4, 1996
 Lt Col Charles H. Ayala, August 5, 1996 – July 22, 1998
 Lt Col Michael J. Kelley, July 23, 1998 – March 22, 2000
 Lt Col Thomas T. Shields, March 23, 2000 – November 2, 2000
 Lt Col Mark L. Hinchman, November 3, 2000 – December 17, 2000
 Lt Col Mona Lisa D. Tucker, December 18, 2000 – June 25, 2002
 Lt Col Michael J. Clark, June 26, 2002 – July 6, 2004
 Lt Col Mark G. Langenderfer, July 7, 2004 – July 9, 2006
 Lt Col Donovan L. Routsis, July 10, 2006 – August 18, 2008
 Lt Col Donald Fielden, August 19, 2008 – February 3, 2010
 Lt Col Fred H. Taylor, February 4, 2010 – August 6, 2012
 Lt Col Lynn Plunkett, August 7, 2012 – July 9, 2014
 Lt Col David A. Case, July 9, 2014 - July 19, 2016 
 Lt Col Heather Uhl, July 19, 2016 - June 21, 2018
 Lt Col Anthony L. Lang, June 21, 2018 - June 22, 2020
 Lt Col Shane M. Warren, June 22, 2020 - Present

Awards and decorations
Air Force Outstanding Unit Award:
 July 1, 1990 – August 5, 1991
 October 1, 1998 – September 30, 2000
 October 1, 2000 – October 1, 2001
 October 1, 2001 – October 1, 2002
 October 2, 2002 – October 1, 2003
 October 1, 2007 - September 30, 2009

Emblem

Description (blazon)
Azure gridlined as a globe Argent, a gauntlet issuant from sinister base bendwise Silver Gray issuing a lightning flash between two arcing lightning flashes bendwise Or; all within a diminished bordure Sable.  Attached above the disc a Gray scroll edged with a narrow Black border.  Attached below the disc a Gray scroll edged with a narrow Black border and inscribed "COMM FOR THE WARFIGHTER" in Black letters.

Significance
Blue and yellow are the Air Force colors. Blue alludes to the sky, the primary theater of Air Force operations. Yellow refers to the sun and the excellence required of Air Force personnel. The globe represents the earth. The gauntlet denotes power and the flexibility of space communications. The lightning bolts symbolize communications through teamwork and unity which result in swift and accurate striking power.

See also
 List of United States Air Force communications squadrons

References

External links
 Official fact sheet
 50th SCS consolidates LAN, multimedia support, 50th Space Wing Public Affairs, February 20, 2007
 50th SCS focuses on info assurance, 50th Space Wing Public Affairs, December 15, 2006
 Comm squadron develops Air Force Standard Desktop, 50th Space Wing Public Affairs, December 14, 2005

Squadrons of the United States Space Force
Communications squadrons of the United States Air Force
Military units and formations in Colorado